WFRS (88.9 FM) is a non-commercial educational, religious-formatted radio station licensed to Smithtown, New York. The station is owned and operated by Family Radio, a Christian radio ministry based in Nashville, Tennessee, and broadcasts the Family Radio - East satellite feed from its transmitter located in Islandia, New York.

External links
 
 

Family Radio stations
Mass media in Suffolk County, New York
FRS